Astartea scoparia, commonly known as common astartea, is a shrub endemic to Western Australia.

It is found along the coast of the Peel, South West and Great Southern regions of Western Australia where it grows in sandy-loamy soils.

References

Eudicots of Western Australia
scoparia
Endemic flora of Western Australia
Plants described in 1844